Since becoming a member of the Australian Football League (AFL) in 1997, 198 players have represented the Port Adelaide Football Club in a senior AFL match. The list below is arranged in the order in which each player made his debut for Port Adelaide in a senior AFL match. Where more than one player made his debut in the same match, those players are listed alphabetically by surname.

Port Adelaide's first AFL game was played against the Collingwood Football Club at the Melbourne Cricket Ground (MCG) in Melbourne, Victoria on 29 March 1997. Port Adelaide has contested two AFL Grand Finals, and have succeeded in winning one of these Grand Finals to claim the 2004 AFL Premiership. There have been 22 players who have played in an AFL premiership-winning side for Port Adelaide.

Port Adelaide Football Club players in the AFL (1997–present)
 Players are listed in order of debut, and statistics are for AFL regular season and finals series matches only. "Career span" years are from the season of the player's debut for Port Adelaide to the year in which they played their final game for Port Adelaide and have since been removed from the playing list. Currently listed players are shaded in green, marked with a # and their career span is listed as "(year of debut)–present". Statistics are correct to the end of the 2016 season.

 Legend
 Currently listed players

- AFL premiership player

 - AFL captain

1990s

2000s

2010s

2020s

Listed players yet to make their debut for Port Adelaide

Notes

References

External links
 Past Players from the Official Port Adelaide Football Club website

Port Adelaide Football Club

Port Adelaide Football Club
Football